Vélopop' is a bike sharing scheme in Avignon, France, launched in July 2009, engineered by Smoove. This community bicycle program comprises 200 bicycles and 17 stations for short term renting. The bicycles are secured by a special fork in easy to install bicycle stands with mechanical keys distributed by automatic dispensers.

The system is designed and assembled in France and accessible at all times, inside and outside city walls.

References

External links
 
 Avignon à vélo association
 Cycle Sud

Community bicycle programs
Avignon
Bicycle sharing in France